The Ray Draper Quintet featuring John Coltrane is the second album by tuba player Ray Draper recorded in 1957 and released on the New Jazz label.

Reception

Scott Yanow of AllMusic reviewed the album: "Draper had ambitious dreams of making the tuba a major jazz solo instrument; the tuba/tenor front line is an unusual and generally successful sound... One does admire Draper's courage, and it is a pity that he hardly recorded at all after 1960 because he had strong potential."
The All About Jazz review by Douglas Payne stated "Even though Draper's career fizzled after only a few more records, this one is probably the best thing he did on his own."

Track listing 
All compositions by Ray Draper except as indicated
 "Clifford's Kappa" – 9:16  
 "Filidé" – 7:16  
 "Two Sons" – 5:24  
 "Paul's Pal" (Sonny Rollins) – 7:14  
 "Under Paris Skies" (Jean Andre Brun, Kim Gannon, Hubert Giraud) – 7:47  
 "I Hadn't Anyone Till You" (Ray Noble) – 3:05

Personnel 
Ray Draper – tuba 
John Coltrane – tenor saxophone (tracks 1–5)
Gil Coggins – piano
Spanky DeBrest – bass
Larry Ritchie – drums

Production
Bob Weinstock – supervisor
Rudy Van Gelder – engineer

References 

1958 albums
Albums produced by Bob Weinstock
Albums recorded at Van Gelder Studio
New Jazz Records albums
Ray Draper albums